Driven (2007) was the inaugural Driven professional wrestling pay-per-view (PPV) event promoted by Ring of Honor (ROH). It took place on June 23, 2007 at the Frontier Fieldhouse in Chicago Ridge, Illinois, and first aired on September 21.

Results

See also
2007 in professional wrestling
List of Ring of Honor pay-per-view events

References

External links
Official site of the PPV

Professional wrestling in the Chicago metropolitan area
Events in Chicago
2000s in Chicago
2007 in Illinois
ROH Driven
June 2007 events in the United States
2007 Ring of Honor pay-per-view events